Harmony Channel was a Comcast on-demand  television network headquartered in Chadds Ford, Pennsylvania, outside of Philadelphia.  The network specialized in delivering mood-elevating visual music experiences - music videos designed to invoke a variety of positive moods.  Programming was organized into seven MoodZones.

Harmony Channel Programming
Harmony Channel programming was organized into seven visual music zones designed to invoke a particular mood using a variety of musical genres.  MoodZones included:

Love Zone - romantic moods and sensual images.
Energy Zone - upbeat music and contemporary visual images.
Play Zone - high-energy electronic dance and world beat music.
Harmony Zone - healing music with nature visuals.
Chill Zone - downtempo lounge moods and artistic visuals.
Dream Zone - ambient meditative soundscapes and sightscapes.
Spirit Zone - inspirational themes from all cultures and faiths.

Companies based in Delaware County, Pennsylvania
Television networks in the United States
American companies established in 2006
Television channels and stations established in 2006
2006 establishments in Pennsylvania
Defunct television networks in the United States